John Adrian Bondy (born 1944 in London) is a retired English mathematician, known for his work in combinatorics and graph theory.

Career

Bondy received his Ph.D. in graph theory from the University of Oxford in 1969. His advisor was Dominic Welsh. Between 1969 and 1994, Bondy was Professor of Graph Theory at the University of Waterloo in Canada, and then, until his retirement, at Université Lyon 1 in France. From 1976, he was managing editor, and, between 1979 and 2004, co-editor-in-chief (together with U. S. R. Murty) of Journal of Combinatorial Theory, Series B. Throughout his career, Bondy has (co-)authored over 100 publications with 51 co-authors, including the widely influential textbook Graph Theory with Applications (with U. S. R. Murty), and supervised 12 Ph.D. students. His Erdős number is 1.

Bondy was dismissed from his tenured position at the University of Waterloo in 1995, after 25 years in which he had been a major contributor to the renown of the University's Department of Combinatorics and Optimization. The reasons for his dismissal centered on "Bondy's acceptance of a teaching post in France, and the acceptability of someone who is on UW's faculty payroll holding a full-time job elsewhere." Protesting the decision, Paul Erdős returned his honorary doctorate to the University of Waterloo, and Vašek Chvátal resigned from his position of Adjunct Professor at the Department of Combinatorics and Optimization.

Personal life

Bondy has a passion for photography, having taken pictures since his childhood. In the 1980s, he regularly exhibited his work, most notably at the Kitchener-Waterloo Art Gallery in Kitchener, Ontario. In 2010, Bondy founded the non-profit association Mind's Eye with the aim "to reflect upon the conceptual links between mathematics and photography." In 2012, he opened a photo gallery with the same name on the Rue Saint-Jacques, Paris. Between 2012 and 2022, Mind's Eye / Galerie Adrian Bondy has hosted 42 exhibitions with works of 27 artists, including John Claridge and Jean Dréville.

Selected publications
 .
 .
 .
 .
 .

See also
 Bondy's theorem
 Bondy–Chvátal theorem
 Even circuit theorem
 Hypohamiltonian graph
 Pancyclic graph

Notes

References
 
 
 
 
 .

External links
 Critique of the dismissal by Jeffrey Shallit

Living people
Graph theorists
Academic staff of the University of Waterloo
Alumni of the University of Oxford
20th-century English mathematicians
1944 births